Head Down may refer to:

 "Head Down" (essay), a 1990 non-fiction essay by Stephen King
 Head Down, Hampshire, England
 Head Down (Moev album), a 1990 album by Moev
 Head Down (Rival Sons album), a 2012 album by Rival Sons
 Head down, a position in skydiving; see freeflying
 "Head Down", a song by Nine Inch Nails, from the album The Slip
 "Head Down", a song by Soundgarden, from the album Superunknown

See also
 Head-down display, as opposed to a heads-up display